Sir Antonio Micallef GCMG was the chief justice of Malta from 1859 to 1880.

References 

Maltese knights
19th-century Maltese judges
Year of birth missing
Year of death missing